The Indian national calendar, sometimes called the Saka calendar, is a solar calendar that is used alongside the Gregorian calendar by The Gazette of India, in news broadcasts by All India Radio, and in calendars and official communications issued by the Government of India. Shaka Samvat is generally 78 years behind of Gregorian Calendar, except during January to March, when it is behind by 79 years.

Originally through historical Indian influence, the Saka calendar is also used in Java and Bali among Indonesian Hindus. Nyepi, the "Day of Silence", is a celebration of the Saka new year in Bali. Nepal's Nepal Sambat evolved from the Saka calendar. The Saka calendar was also used in several areas in the modern-day Philippines as written in the Laguna Copperplate Inscription. In India, Yugabda is also used with corresponding months of Saka/Nepal Sambat. Yugabda is based on Kaliyuga Sankhya preserved by Indian Astrology. The Kali Yuga began  years ago and has  years left as of  CE. Kali Yuga will end in the year 428,899 CE.

Calendar structure 
The calendar months follow the signs of the tropical zodiac rather than the sidereal zodiac normally used with the Hindu and Buddhist calendars.

Mnemonics: 

Saka : ⁰/111111000000

Greg.: ²/112233332210

Chaitra is the first month of the calendar and begins on the March equinox, similar to Farvardin, the first month of the Iranian Solar Hijri calendar. Chaitra has 30 days and starts on March 22, except in leap years, when it has 31 days and starts on March 21. The months in the first half of the year all have 31 days, to take into account the slower movement of the sun across the ecliptic at this time.

The names of the months are derived from the older Hindu lunisolar calendar, so variations in spellings exist, and there is a possible source of confusion as to what calendar a date belongs to.

The names of the weekdays are derived from the seven classical planets (see Navagraha). The first day of the week is Ravivara (Sunday). The official calendar reckoned by the government of India has Sunday as the first and Saturday as the last day of the week.

Years are counted in the Saka era, which starts its year 0 in the year 78 of the Christian Era/Common Era. To determine leap years, add 78 to the Saka year – if the result is a leap year in the Gregorian calendar, then the Saka year is a leap year as well.

History

Vikram Period 

The Satavahana king Shalivahana is believed to have created the calendar that came to be known as the Saka Calendar after he defeated Saka rulers.

Adoption 
Senior Indian Astrophysicist Meghnad Saha was the head of the Calendar Reform Committee under the aegis of the Council of Scientific and Industrial Research. Other members of the Committee were: A. C. Banerjee, K. L. Daftari, J. S. Karandikar, Gorakh Prasad, R. V. Vaidya and N. C. Lahiri. It was Saha's effort, which led to the formation of the Committee. The task before the Committee was to prepare an accurate calendar based on scientific study, which could be adopted uniformly throughout India. The Committee had to undertake a detailed study of thirty different calendars prevalent in different parts of the country. The task was further complicated by the integration of those calendars with religion and local sentiments. India's first prime minister, Jawaharlal Nehru, in his preface to the Report of the Committee, published in 1955, wrote: "They (different calendars) represent past political divisions in the country ... . Now that we have attained Independence, it is obviously desirable that there should be a certain uniformity in the calendar for our civic, social, and other purposes, and this should be done on a scientific approach to this problem." Usage started officially at 1 Chaitra 1879, Saka Era, or 22 March 1957.

India has adopted pie Ephemeris Time in the Indian Ephemeris from 1960 onwards ' m pursuance of the resolution passed1 by the International Astronomical Union in 1955 to adopt the Ephemeris Time in all national ephemendes, m order to have uniformity with other nations in indicating the position of the
planets in the Epheirteris A statement is laid on the table giving technical reasonsThe Greenwich Mean Time, lately called Universal Time, had so long been the basic measure of time in terms of which the positions of the Sun, Moon and planets were calculated and shown in the Ephemera It has been observed for some years past that the rotation of the Earth, by which the Universal Time and in fact all mean solar times are determined,is not uniform, it has got a gradual retardation as well as fluctuations for various reasons, as a result of which the Universal Time does not increase uniformly ' As a uniformly increasing time-scale is the independent argument necessary in dynamical astronomy, it has been decided in accordance with a resolution of the International Astronomical Union held at Dublin in 1955 that the positions of the sun, moon and planets would be given in all the national ephemendes with effect from the issue of 1960, not in terms of the Universal Time but of Ephemeries Time defined by resolution of 1952 meeting of the International Astronomical Union This has been done in all the national ephemendes from the 1960 issue, and India have also adopted the same Due to the existence of the fluctuation factor in the rotation of the Earth and consequently in the expression of Ephemera Time, it is not possible to give a definite value of Ephemeris Time in Advance, it is possible only to estimate an approximate value by extrapolation The difference between the Ephemeris Time and the Greenwich Mean Time is now very small, the estimated value of the difference for 1960 is 35*0 seconds of time, so that at Oh-Om-Os G M.T the Ephemeris Time's Oh-Om-35s

See also

 Astronomical basis of the Hindu calendar
 Bengali calendar, a related Indic calendar
 Hindu calendar
 History of calendars
 Indian New Year's days
 Malayalam calendar
 List of calendars
 Solar Hijri calendar
 Ritu (Indian season)
 Shaka era
 Tamil calendar
 Vikram Samvat
 Bisuddhasiddhanta Panjika

Notes

References

Sources
Saha, M. N. (Chairman) (1955) Report of the Calendar Reform Committee New Delhi: Council of Scientific and Industrial Research

External links
 Calendars and their History (by L.E. Doggett)
 Indian Calendars (by Leow Choon Lian, pdf, 1.22mb)
 Indian National Calendar
 India Meteorological Department/ Positional Astronomy Centre: current and past issues of the Rashtriya Panchang and The Indian Astronomical Ephemeris

National calendar
National symbols of India
Months of the Hindu calendar
Time in India
1957 introductions
Solar calendars